The Germany–Korea Treaty of 1883 was negotiated between representatives of Germany and Korea.

Background
In 1876, Korea established a trade treaty with Japan after Japanese ships approached Ganghwado and threatened to fire on the Korean capital city. Treaty negotiations with several Western countries were made possible by the completion of this initial Japanese overture.

In 1882, the Americans concluded a treaty and established diplomatic relations, which served as a template for subsequent negotiations with other Western powers.

Treaty provisions
The Germans and Koreans negotiated and approved a multi-article treaty with provisions similar to other Western nations.

Ministers from Germany to Korea were appointed in accordance with this treaty; and these diplomats were: Capt. Zembisch, appointed November 18, 1884; T. Kempermann, appointed May 17, 1886; H. Weipert, appointed September 29, 1900.

The treaty remained in effect even after the protectorate was established in 1905.

See also
 List of Ambassadors from Germany to South Korea
 Unequal treaties

Notes

References
 Kim, Chun-gil. (2005). The History of Korea. Westport, Connecticut: Greenwood Press. ; ;  OCLC 217866287
 Korean Mission to the Conference on the Limitation of Armament, Washington, D.C., 1921-1922. (1922). Korea's Appeal to the Conference on Limitation of Armament. Washington: U.S. Government Printing Office. OCLC 12923609
 Yŏng-ho Ch'oe; William Theodore De Bary; Martina Deuchler and Peter Hacksoo Lee. (2000). Sources of Korean Tradition: From the Sixteenth to the Twentieth Centuries. New York: Columbia University Press. ; ;  OCLC 248562016

Unequal treaties
Treaties of the German Empire
Treaties of the Joseon dynasty
Treaty
1883 treaties